Zoltán Horváth (born April 30, 1974) is a Hungarian politician, President of the General Assembly of Baranya County between 2011 and 2014.

He became a Member of Parliament from Fidesz's Baranya County Regional List on 18 June 2012, replacing Erik Bánki. Horváth was a member of the Parliamentary Committee on Sport and Tourism. He was appointed Director of the Baranya County Government Office on 1 July 2014.

References

1974 births
Living people
Fidesz politicians
Members of the National Assembly of Hungary (2010–2014)
People from Mohács